The Margin-at-Risk (short: MaR) is a quantity used to manage short-term liquidity risks due to variation of margin requirements, i.e. it is a financial risk occurring when trading commodities. Similar to the Value-at-Risk (VaR), but instead of the EBIT it is a quantile of the (expected) cash flow distribution.

Description 
A MaR requires (1) a currency, (2) a confidence level (e.g. 90%) and (3) a holding period (e.g. 3 days).
The idea is that a given portfolio loss will be compensated by a margin call by the same amount.
The MaR quantifies the "worst case" margin-call and is only driven by market prices.

See also 
 Liquidity at risk
 Value at risk
 Profit at risk
 Earnings at risk
 Cash flow at risk

References 

Mathematical finance
Financial risk management
Monte Carlo methods in finance
Credit risk